The Wonderful Birch is a Finnish/Russian fairy tale. A variant on Cinderella, it is Aarne–Thompson folktale type 510A, the persecuted heroine. It makes use of shapeshifting motifs. Andrew Lang included it in The Red Fairy Book.

Synopsis
A peasant woman meets a witch, who threatens to transform her if she does something; she does not do it, but the witch turns her into a sheep anyway. The witch assumes the form of the peasant woman and goes home to her husband. After a time, she bears him a daughter. The witch pets and pampers her own daughter, and ill-treats her stepdaughter, the peasant's daughter by his sheep-wife.

The witch-stepmother tells her husband to slaughter the sheep before it runs away.  He agrees, but her stepdaughter hears and runs to the sheep, lamenting.  Her mother tells her not to eat anything made from her body but bury the bones.  She does so, and a birch tree grows on the grave.

The king gives a festival, inviting everyone, and the witch sends off the husband with her younger daughter, throws a potful of barleycorns in the hearth, and tells the older stepdaughter that if she does not pick barley corns from ashes, it will be worse for her.  The birch tells her to strike the hearth with one of her branches, which sorts them, and then magically bathes and dresses her. Then it told her to go to the fields and whistle, for a horse, partly gold, partly silver, and the third partly something more precious will appear to take her to the castle. The girl then goes into the festival.

The king's son falls in love with her, and has her sit beside him, but the witch's daughter gnaws bones under the table, and the king's son, thinking she is a dog, gives her such a kick to keep her away that her arm is broken.  He has the door latch smeared with tar, and when the stepdaughter leaves, her copper ring is caught in it.  When the witch returns home, she tells the stepdaughter that the king's son has fallen in love with her daughter and carries her about, only he had dropped her and broken her arm.

The king holds another festival.  The witch tries to keep her stepdaughter busy by throwing hemp-seed on the hearth, but the stepdaughter, with the birch's aid, goes to the festival as before. This time, the king's son breaks the witch's daughter's leg, and has the doorpost smeared with tar, so that her silver circlet is caught.

The king holds a third festival.  The witch tries to keep her stepdaughter busy by throwing milk on the hearth, but the stepdaughter, with the birch's aid, goes to the festival as before. This time, the king's son kicks out the witch's daughter's eye, and has the threshold smeared with tar, so that one of her golden slippers is caught.

The king's son then sets out to discover who the maiden was, with the circlet, ring, and the slipper. When he is about to try them on the stepdaughter, the witch intervenes and gets them on her daughter. He takes both the daughter and the stepdaughter, and when they came to a river, the stepdaughter whispers to the prince not to rob her of her silver and gold. He throws the witch's daughter over the river to serve as a bridge and he and the stepdaughter cross, and takes her for his bride. Then they visit the magical birch tree and get treasures and gifts. The tree vanishes soon after. While stretching as a bridge in her grief, the younger sister wishes that a hollow golden stalk grow out of her navel so that her mother would recognize her. Immediately a hollow golden stalk grows out of her on the bridge.

In time, the older stepsister delivers a son. The witch, hearing of this, and believing she is her daughter, goes to the castle, and on her way, seeing the golden stalk, is about to cut it. Her daughter cries out not to cut her navel, and that she is the bridge. The witch hurries to the castle and turns the older stepdaughter into a reindeer while the witch's daughter replaces her.

The king is told by an old widow that his wife is in the forest in the shape of a reindeer, and his present wife is the witch's daughter. When he asks how he can get her back, the widow tells him to let her take the child into the forest. When she goes for it, the witch objects, but the king's son insists on her taking it. In the forest, the widow sings to the reindeer, which then comes and suckles her child, and tells the woman to bring it again next day.

Next day, the witch again objects, but the widow takes it to the reindeer as before. The child becomes extremely beautiful, and its father asks the widow if it is possible for his wife to regain her human shape. The widow does not know, but tells him to go to the forest, and when the reindeer throws off its skin he is to burn it while she is searching his wife's head.

All this is done, and she resumes her human shape; but not liking to be seen naked, she turns into a spinning wheel, a washing-vat, and a spindle, all of which her husband destroys till she becomes human again. On their return to the castle, he orders a huge fire to be made under the bath with tar, and its approach to be covered with brown and blue cloth. Then he invites the witch's daughter to take a bath. She and her mother, in stepping over the cloth, fall a depth of three fathoms into the fire and tar to their death; the witch puts a curse on all mankind.

In the ending to Andrew Lang's version of this fairy tale, after the older stepdaughter is turned back into a human, after being asked that she won't be eaten up, the witch and her daughter both run away, and if they have not stopped still, at a great age. The older stepdaughter, the prince, and the son all live happily ever after.

See also

Bawang Putih Bawang Merah
Brother and Sister
Bushy Bride
Cinderella
Fair, Brown and Trembling
Finette Cendron
The Child who came from an Egg
The Golden Slipper
The Three Little Men in the Wood
The White and the Black Bride
The Witch in the Stone Boat

References

Finnish fairy tales
Russian fairy tales
Fiction about shapeshifting
Witchcraft in fairy tales
ATU 500-559
False hero